Alois Kayser (March 29, 1877 in Lupstein, Alsace – October 21, 1944 in Chuuk) was a German-French Roman Catholic missionary who spent almost forty years on Nauru and wrote a Nauruan grammar (and possibly a Nauruan language dictionary). In 1943, he was deported along with Pierre Clivaz, a Swiss missionary, as well as most of the Nauruan population, by the Japanese to Micronesia, where he died.

In his honour, the government of Nauru named the technical school in the district Ewa after him.

See also
 Philip Delaporte

External links
 Review of Kayser's grammar

1877 births
1944 deaths
History of Nauru
People from Alsace-Lorraine
German Roman Catholic missionaries
Roman Catholic missionaries in Nauru
Translators to Nauruan
People deported from Nauru
German expatriates in Nauru
Missionary linguists